L.S.V. is a secret honor society at the University of Missouri dedicated to "promoting and improving the status of women" and recognizing "the most outstanding upperclass women" at the university, who "strive to promote and improve the status of women."

L.S.V. was revealed to the campus in February 1908, and speculation immediately began that it was the female sister-chapter to QEBH. L.S.V. is the highest honor bestowed upon a woman at the University. The society taps four to six outstanding women or men  during the spring of their junior year, and their identities remain secret until the annual Tap Day ceremony near the close of the following academic year. Although L.S.V. is more than 100 years old, it did not begin taking part in Tap Day ceremonies until the mid-1960s.

See also
 Honor society
 Mystical Seven (Missouri)
 QEBH

References

Collegiate secret societies
Honor societies
Student societies in the United States
Student organizations established in 1908
1908 establishments in Missouri